Patriot is a studio album by the Slovak rock band Tublatanka, released on 17 May 2010.

Track listing
 "Cítim sa fajn" (Maťo Ďurinda / Martin Sarvaš) - 4:02
 "Život s tebou" (Maťo Ďurinda) - 3:41
 "Cesta snov" (Maťo Ďurinda ) - 3:46
 "Panika" (Maťo Ďurinda) - 3:21
 "Mimozemský hlas" (Maťo Ďurinda) - 4:34
 "Mesto nesplnených snov" (Maťo Ďurinda) - 4:19
 "Neverná láska" (Maťo Ďurinda) - 4:14
 "Snenie"  (Juraj Kupec / Martin Sarvaš) - 3:48
 "Ja sa mám" (Maťo Ďurinda / Miroslav Jurika, Marián Brezáni) - 3:11
 "Veľký deň"  (Juraj Topor / Martin Sarvaš) - 3:04
 "Čierny dážď"  (Maťo Ďurinda / Miroslav Jurika, Marián Brezáni) - 3:53
 "Hej hej mama" (Maťo Ďurinda / Vlado Krausz) - 2:44
 "Pieseň pre Doda" (Šlabikár VIII.)“ - (Maťo Ďurinda / Martin Sarvaš) - 3:58
 "Zostaň aspoň chvíľu" (Maťo Ďurinda) - 3:36

Credits
 Maťo Ďurinda – lead vocals, guitar
 Peter Schlosser – bass guitar
 Juraj Topor – drums
 Salko – keyboards

References

Tublatanka albums
2005 albums